"I Love Me Better Than That" is the title of an R&B/gospel single by Shirley Murdock. It was the first single released from her second gospel album Soulfood. The single spent seven weeks on the Billboard Gospel Songs chart and peaked at No. 22.

Chart positions

References

2007 singles
2007 songs
Gospel songs